St. Peter's Catholic Church or St. Peters Catholic Church may refer to:
St. Peter's Catholic Church (Charlotte, North Carolina)
St. Peter's Catholic Church (Council Bluffs, Iowa), listed on the NRHP in Iowa
St. Peters Catholic Church (Worcester, Massachusetts), listed on the NRHP in Massachusetts
St. Peter's Catholic Church (Rensselaer, Missouri), listed on the NRHP in Missouri
St. Peter's Catholic Church (Wibaux, Montana), listed on the NRHP in Montana
St. Peter's Catholic Church (Jefferson, South Dakota), listed on the NRHP in South Dakota
St. Peter's and St. Joseph's Catholic Churches, Oconto, Wisconsin, listed on the NRHP in Wisconsin
St. Peter's Catholic Church (Canton, Ohio)
St. Peter Catholic Church (Manhattan)

See also
St. Peter's Church (disambiguation)
St. Peter's Roman Catholic Church (disambiguation)